Edward A. Everett was a member of the Wisconsin State Assembly.

Biography
Everett was born on March 23, 1861, in Beloit, Wisconsin. He later worked in the hotel industry in Chicago, Illinois before moving to Eagle River, Wisconsin in 1896. The following year, he took ownership of what would become known as The Everett Resort in nearby Washington, Vilas County, Wisconsin. In 2008, the resort was added to the National Register of Historic Places.

Assembly career
Everett was a member of the Assembly during the 1905, 1907, 1915 and 1917 sessions. He was a Republican.

References

Politicians from Beloit, Wisconsin
Businesspeople from Chicago
Politicians from Chicago
Businesspeople from Wisconsin
People from Eagle River, Wisconsin
1861 births
Year of death missing
Republican Party members of the Wisconsin State Assembly